
Gmina Mieroszów is an urban-rural gmina (administrative district) in Wałbrzych County, Lower Silesian Voivodeship, in south-western Poland.

Neighbouring gminas
Gmina Mieroszów is bordered by the towns of Boguszów-Gorce, Jedlina-Zdrój and Wałbrzych, and the gminas of Czarny Bór, Głuszyca, Kamienna Góra and Lubawka.

Villages
Apart from the town of Mieroszów, the gmina contains the villages of Golińsk, Kowalowa, Łączna, Nowe Siodło, Różana, Rybnica Leśna, Sokołowsko and Unisław Śląski.

Twin towns – sister cities

Gmina Mieroszów is twinned with:

 Debrzno, Poland
 Friedland, Brandenburg, Germany
 Friedland, Lower Saxony, Germany
 Friedland, Mecklenburg-Vorpommern, Germany
 Frýdlant, Czech Republic
 Frýdlant nad Ostravicí, Czech Republic
 Korfantów, Poland
 Mirosławiec, Poland
 Pravdinsk, Russia

References

Mieroszow
Wałbrzych County